Louise-Cécile Descamps-Sabouret (born 3 October 1855 Paris) was a French painter and botanical artist.

She studied under Tony Robert-Fleury and made her debut at the 1879 Paris Salon. In 1883 she became a member of the Société des Artistes Français. Descamps-Sabouret produced illustrations for La Revue Horticole (1891-1901) and the Journal des Roses.

She was a member of Société nationale d'horticulture de France and lived in the rue de Tolbiac in Paris.

References

Biodiversity Heritage Library Flickr

Botanical illustrators
1855 births
1916 deaths